Parrita is a canton and its only district in the Puntarenas province of Costa Rica.

Toponymy
The origin of the name, it is said, has to do with a woman named Rita who lived in one of the original settlements. Rita had a business and received packages. "Es pa' Rita" (It's for Rita) was often heard so the canton was called Parrita.

History 
Parrita was created on 5 July 1971 by decree 4787.

Almost all of Costa Rican territory was inhabited before the arrival of the Spanish. The Huetars lived in this area. In 1924, a young German installed the first banana plantation near the Pirrís River (also called the Parrita River) which encouraged migration of people from San José and Guanacaste.

Geography 
Parrita has an area of  km2 and a mean elevation of  metres.

The canton lies along the central Pacific coast between the mouths of the Tusubres River and Damas River. Inland the canton is delineated by a series of rivers that meander through the valleys of the coastal mountain range.

Districts 
The canton of Parrita is subdivided into only one district, occupying the same area as the whole canton:
 Parrita, with postal code 60901

Demographics 

For the 2011 census, Parrita had a population of  inhabitants.

Transportation

Road transportation 
The canton is covered by the following road routes:

References 

Cantons of Puntarenas Province
Populated places in Puntarenas Province